Bishop Harold Ivory Williams (April 20, 1921 – July 4, 2014) was the senior prelate of the Mt. Calvary Holy Church of America Inc. from 1972 - 2009. Weeks before his death, the previous bishop appointed Williams to serve as his successor. His second wife was the gospel icon Pastor Shirley Caesar.

Early life 
Harold I. Williams was born April 20, 1921, in Benton, Maryland and attended the public schools of Baltimore, Maryland, including the Frederick Douglass High School. He held a B.A. Degree from Coppin State College, also in Baltimore, Maryland; a Master of Divinity and a Doctorate of Ministry from Howard University in Washington, D.C. Williams also took post-graduate studies at the St. Mary's Seminary in Baltimore, Maryland.

Career 
Williams joined the Mt. Calvary Holy Church at the age of 16. In 1949, he pastored his first church in Washington D.C., Mt. Calvary Holy Church #1. Mt. Calvary later merged with the Christ is the Answer Church pastored by Rev. Alfred Owens to become Greater Mt. Calvary Holy Church. The church, with over 4000 members, is also the national headquarters for Mt. Calvary Holy Churches of America, Inc. In 1958, Williams co-founded the Mount Calvary Holy Temple in Baltimore, Maryland with his mother, Ethel Williams, and his first wife, Amanda Williams.

In 1972, Williams was appointed the Sr. Bishop and Overseer of the Mount Calvary Holy Churches of America, Inc., which has grown to over 60 churches in the United States and abroad since 1948.

Williams was a member of many organizations including the Minister Conference of Baltimore and Vicinity; the Baltimore Clergy In Action; the Pastor's Conference; the Pentecostal Ministers Alliance; and the Bishop's Council International.

Personal life 
Williams and Amanda Williams were married for 35 years before her death, and were the parents of two children, Harold I. Williams, Jr., and Hope Ivey Mason. He also had two grandchildren.

References

2014 deaths
American bishops
1921 births